Munditia echinata is a minute sea snail, a marine gastropod mollusc in the family Liotiidae.

Distribution
This marine species is endemic to the Three Kings Islands, New Zealand.

The species is found at depths of about 475 m.

Description
Its shell is very small, solid, boldly sculptured with three spiral rows of long spines, otherwise the surface is smooth. It is white in colour and up to 0.6 mm high and 1.4 mm wide.

References

 Powell A. W. B. (1979), New Zealand Mollusca, William Collins Publishers Ltd, Auckland, New Zealand 1979

External links
 New Zealand Mollusca: Munditia echinata

echinata
Gastropods of New Zealand
Gastropods described in 1937